The European Journal of Pharmaceutical Sciences is a peer-reviewed medical journal and the official journal of the European Federation for Pharmaceutical Sciences. It publishes research reports, review articles, and scientific commentaries on all aspects of the pharmaceutical sciences. The abstracts of the biennial European Congress of Pharmaceutical Sciences are published in a supplement of the journal.

Abstracting and indexing 
The journal is abstracted and indexed in BIOSIS Previews, Beilstein database, CAB Abstracts, Chemical Abstracts, Current Contents/Life Sciences, International Pharmaceutical Abstracts, EMBASE, MEDLINE, Natural Products Update/Royal Society of Chemistry, Science Citation Index, and Scopus.

External links 
 
 European Federation for Pharmaceutical Sciences

Elsevier academic journals
Pharmacology journals
English-language journals
Publications established in 1993
Journals published between 13 and 25 times per year